Roderick Devone Issac (born February 20, 1989) is a former American football cornerback. He was drafted by the Jacksonville Jaguars as a fifth round pick in the 2011 NFL Draft. He played college football at Middle Tennessee State University.

High school career
Issac attended Miami Central High School in Miami, Florida.

College career
Issac was a senior captain at Middle Tennessee State University. Issac was voted first team all-conference by the coaches and media of the Sun Belt Conference.

Professional career

Jacksonville Jaguars
Issac was selected by the Jacksonville Jaguars in the fifth round of the 2011 NFL Draft with the 147th overall pick. His fifth-round selection was the highest for a Middle Tennessee player since wide receiver Tyrone Calico went to the Tennessee Titans in the second round of the 2003 NFL Draft.

Issac was released on August 31, 2012.

Tampa Bay Storm
On July 2, 2013, Issac was assigned to the Tampa Bay Storm of the Arena Football League. Issac was reassigned by the Storm on July 18, 2013. Issac was again assigned by the Storm on March 1, 2014. He was placed on reassignment on March 20, 2015.

References

External links
 
 
 

1989 births
Living people
Miami Central Senior High School alumni
Players of American football from Miami
American football cornerbacks
Middle Tennessee Blue Raiders football players
Middle Tennessee State University alumni
Jacksonville Jaguars players
Tampa Bay Storm players
Orlando Predators players